Maestrini is a surname. Notable people with the surname include:

 Alessandra Maestrini (born 1977), Brazilian actress and musician
 Dario Maestrini (1886–1975), Italian physiologist and scientist
 Liliane Maestrini (born 1987), Brazilian beach volleyball player

Surnames of Italian origin